Ivan Lazarev is the name of:
Ivan Lazarev (basketball) (born 1991), Russian basketball player
Ivan Lazarev (luger) (born 1983), Russian natural track luger
Ivan Davidovich Lazarev (1820–1878), Russian general of Armenian origin
Ivan Lazarevich Lazarev (1735–1801), Russian jeweler of Armenian origin
Ivan Petrovich Lazarev (died 1803), Russian general killed by Mariam of Georgia, Mariam Tsitsishvili